A number of units of measurement were used in Uruguay to measure quantities.  Metric system was optional in Uruguay since 1866, and has been compulsory since 1894.

System before metric system

The older system was the Spanish (Castilian) system with some modification.

Mass

One libra was equal to 460 g (1.014286 lb).

Capacity

One fanega was equal to 274 L (7.776 bushels).

References

Uruguayan culture
Uruguay